"James Brown Is Dead" is a song by Dutch electronic dance music duo L.A. Style, produced by Wessel van Diepen and Denzil Slemming. It was released in August 1991 as the lead single from their debut album, L.A. Style (1993). The song was a major hit across Europe, reaching number-one in Belgium, the Netherlands and Spain. Additionally, it also reached the top 10 in Australia, Germany, Sweden and Switzerland. In the US, it peaked at number 59 on the Billboard Hot 100. 

The song inspired multiple answer songs and is considered a "techno classic" with artists like DJ Irene mixing it into their sets and DJ Boozy Woozy who used samples of Mary J. Blige's "Family Affair" with the main sample of "James Brown Is Dead" to create his song "Party Affair" (2002).
In 2001, Wessel van Diepen and Arista Records released "James Brown Is Dead 2001", a new version of the L.A. Style original.

Critical reception
Andy Kastanas from The Charlotte Observer wrote, "This is high energy rave at its frantic beat. Racing forward like a locomotive, it never slows down until you're exhausted. The voice tells you that "James Brown is dead" while the beat rocks your body from here to eternity." Robert Hilburn from Los Angeles Times commented in his year-end review of 1992, "A good starting point because this record’s self-conscious, yet unapologetic celebration of dance-floor minimalism helped give the movement credibility and direction. Released in 1991, but it enjoyed its greatest success this year."

Track listing
 Europe, CD single (1991)
 "James Brown Is Dead" (Radio Edit) - 3:32
 "James Brown Is Dead"	- 5:38
 "James Brown Is Dead" - 5:09

 US, CD single (1992)
 "James Brown Is Dead (7" Version of Original Mix (Without Rap))" 	3:06 	
 "James Brown Is Dead (7" Version of Original Mix (With Rap))" - 3:30 	
 "James Brown Is Dead (Rock Radio Mix)(Vocals – Chris Randall of Sister Machine Gun)" - 3:20 	
 "James Brown Is Dead (Crossover Radio Mix)" - 3:57 	
 "James Brown Is Dead (Original Mix (Without Rap))" - 5:38 	
 "James Brown Is Dead (Original Mix (With Rap))" - 6:04 	
 "James Brown Is Dead (Deadly Remix)" - 5:26 	
 "James Brown Is Dead (Wide Awake Remix)" _ 5:21 	
 "James Brown Is Dead (Take Outs)" - 0:55

Charts

Answer songs
In the wake of "James Brown Is Dead" the song "James Brown Is Still Alive" was released that same year by Holy Noise, a techno group also from the Netherlands.  Although the first song's lyrics do actually assert that James Brown , "the hardest working man in showbiz is alive", the Holy Noise song is regarded as an answer to the L.A. Style song.
In 1992, Mexican comedian Memo Ríos recorded a Spanish parody called "Pedro Infante murió" ("Pedro Infante Is Dead") referring to the Mexican film actor.

In popular culture
Professional wrestler and mixed martial artist Yoji Anjo has used the song as his entrance music in UWF International.

References

1991 songs
1991 debut singles
Cultural depictions of James Brown
Songs about musicians
Songs about soul
Songs about death
Dutch Top 40 number-one singles
Number-one singles in Spain
Ultratop 50 Singles (Flanders) number-one singles
Techno songs
Eurodance songs
ZYX Music singles
Arista Records singles